Fuss and Feathers is a 1918 American silent comedy film directed by Fred Niblo. It is not known whether the film currently survives, which suggests that it is a lost film.

Plot
A young girl suddenly finds herself wealthy, but lacking in social graces.  She calls upon the disinherited son from a wealthy family for help.

Cast
 Enid Bennett as Susie Baldwin
 Douglas MacLean as Robert Leedyard
 J. P. Lockney as Pete Baldwin (as John P. Lockney)
 Charles K. French as Martin Ledyard
 Sylvia Ashton as Mrs. Ledyard
 Robert McKim as J. Wells Stanton
 Lucille Young as "High Bow" Flow (as Lucile Young)

References

External links

1918 films
American silent feature films
American black-and-white films
1918 comedy films
Films directed by Fred Niblo
Silent American comedy films
Paramount Pictures films
1910s American films